Cesvi (Italian, "cooperazione e sviluppo", cooperation and development) is an Italian humanitarian organizations. Founded in 1985, it has about 30 offices all over the world.

Cesvi provides assistance in emergency situations (including famine and epidemics (especially malaria and dengue in the South East Asia, malaria and HIV/AIDS in Africa), helps refugees (e.g. North Uganda and DR Congo) and flood victims, supports reconstruction after disasters (earthquakes, tsunami), implements projects for sustainable development and environmental defence in poor countries.

The organization is sponsored by Italian private donors (34%), public donors (European Union, Ministry of Foreign Affairs of Italy, United Nations agencies), foundations, companies, local authorities.  Among its fields of expertise are the problems of food/nutrition, HIV/AIDS, health, refugees and IDPs, shelter, water and sanitation.

The Cesvi projects in Vietnam include education of mothers and schoolchildren, growth monitoring, training of health workers on community and clinical nutrition, scientific workshops for university professors and trainers, production and distribution of food and supplements for kindergartens, hospitals and families, microcredit support of integrated farming systems at the household level, clinical consultations, nutritional rehabilitation.

External links 
 

Organizations established in 1985
International nongovernmental organizations
Charities based in Italy
1985 establishments in Italy